Angela M. Cadwell is a retired United States Air Force major general who last served as the director for cyberspace operations of the United States Northern Command.

References 

Living people
Year of birth missing (living people)
Place of birth missing (living people)
United States Air Force generals
Major generals